Corowa Cougars Rugby League Football Club is an Australian rugby league football club based on the New South Wales and Victorian border. The club is based at Corowa, New South Wales formed in the late 1987. They conduct teams for both junior and senior teams.

Notable  Juniors
- Aaron Murphy
- Anthony Murphy
- Jade Stubbs
- Jannssen O’Malley
- Shaun Boyer

See also

Rugby league in New South Wales
Rugby league in Victoria

References

External links
Corowa Cougars Fox Sports pulse

Rugby league teams in New South Wales
Rugby clubs established in 1987
1987 establishments in Australia
Corowa